High Five was a 2010 marketing effort to create a national identity for Columbus, Ohio by linking five districts along  of historic High Street.

Districts

University District

The Ohio State University has one of the largest campuses in the US. The district houses 50,000 students and provides sporting events, festivals, concerts and night life.

Short North

The Short North is a collection of galleries, restaurants, and boutiques. This district features historic architecture, including arches lining the street.

Arena District

The Arena District is a  development project that is contains housing and restaurants, along with concert and sporting venues. The district hosts the Columbus Blue Jackets at Nationwide Arena and the Columbus Clippers at Huntington Park.

Downtown

The Ohio Statehouse and the headquarters of multiple industries are located downtown, including Huntington Bank and Nationwide Insurance. Downtown also has parks such as Columbus Commons and the Scioto Mile, and historic theaters.

German Village

German Village is a historic neighborhood south of Downtown Columbus.

References

External links
 High Five Columbus at the Internet Archive

 
Columbus
Neighborhoods in Columbus, Ohio